Greville Howard may refer to:
 Greville Howard (St Ives MP) (1909–1987), British Conservative and National Liberal politician, MP for St Ives 1950–1966
 Greville Howard, Baron Howard of Rising (born 1941), British politician, Conservative Party life peer since 2004